Simin-e Zagheh (also Romanized as Sīmīn-e Zāgheh and Sīmīn Zāgheh; also known as Simīr-e Zāgheh) is a village in Simineh Rud Rural District, in the Central District of Bahar County, Hamadan Province, Iran. At the 2006 census, its population was 1,428, in 388 families.

References 

Populated places in Bahar County